Corn on the Cop is the title of a 1965 Warner Bros. Merrie Melodies animated family short cartoon presentation directed by Irv Spector, and the only time that Spector, who was mostly known as a story artist, ever acted as director on a theatrical cartoon. The short was released on July 24, 1965, and stars Daffy Duck, Porky Pig and Granny. The voices were performed by Mel Blanc (Daffy, Porky and any generic unnamed male voices) and Joanie Gerber (Granny and any generic unnamed female voices). The short is notable for marking Porky Pig's final cartoon appearance during the golden age of American animation (aside from 1966's Mucho Locos, where he appeared in footage reused from Robin Hood Daffy).

The title for this short is a play on the phrase "corn on the cob."

Plot
This cartoon has three themes in its story: impersonation, Halloween and doubles - ordinary Halloween night preparations made by Granny for when trick-or-treaters come calling are transformed by a chase by policemen Daffy and Porky for a grocery store's robber into a mix-up of who is who - for most of this cartoon after Granny's departure from the store, Granny is trying to keep herself safe from the madness of Daffy and Porky's chase for the robber.

Story
On Halloween night, Granny is shopping for candy at a local grocery store - when she leaves to head home, she starts explaining to the audience that she is preparing for when troublesome kids, or, as she prefers to call them, "juvenile delinquents", come to her home for Halloween treats from her before her explanation is stopped by two kids in costumes appearing out of nowhere and scaring her into running away, leaving her calling out for police as she runs; the store's next customer is an armed robber who is disguised in a blouse and skirt identical to what Granny is wearing which means the store cashier is left in confusion about this change in behaviour after the thief steals every trace of money - policemen Daffy and Porky are given the suspect's description and attempt a chase to catch the robber and end his mischief once and for all.

Most of the rest of the cartoon depicts Daffy and Porky confusing Granny with the actual robber (because of their identical clothing) and bungling said attempts to capture the robber. An annoyed Granny, who has no idea what is going on, mistakes the inept policemen for mischievous trick-or-treaters, while the robber (who is hiding out in a vacant apartment in a building across the street from the same building where Granny is living) also foils every attempt by Daffy and Porky to capture him, perhaps also trying to reverse the roles of who is arrested so that Daffy and Porky may be arrested in his place if Granny successfully assumes that Daffy and Porky are troublesome trick-or-treaters themselves and calls for police - if Daffy and Porky are arrested, the robber will be free to cause more trouble.

Eventually, as this short progresses to its conclusion, Granny comes to the decision of including the robber in her viewing of who is who in her seeing of the events and catches her "double". After giving the robber a spanking, she hands him over to Officer Flaherty who commends her for catching the robber, after which she tells him "there are two other juvenile delinquents" (referring to Daffy and Porky) who should be spanked as well but decides to have their parents spank them - when she asks for their addresses, Daffy starts to give their precinct address before he stops to instead beg her to back off.

Milestones
Granny - voiced here by Joan Gerber instead of June Foray - makes her final appearance during the classic era. Corn on the Cop also reveals Granny's actual last name: Webster (in the closing scene where Daffy and Porky's superior police officer addresses Granny by name).

This would also be Porky's final new appearance in the classic era, though he also appeared in Mucho Locos though, in archive footage.

Crew
 Director: Irv Spector 
 Story: Friz Freleng
 Animation: Manny Perez, Warren Batchelder, Bob Matz
 Layout: Dick Ung
 Backgrounds: Tom O'Loughlin
 Film Editor: Lee Gunther
 Voice Characterizations: Mel Blanc, Joanie Gerber
 Music: Bill Lava
 Produced by: David H. DePatie and Friz Freleng

See also
List of American films of 1965

References

External links
 

1965 animated films
1965 short films
Merrie Melodies short films
Warner Bros. Cartoons animated short films
American films about Halloween
Daffy Duck films
Porky Pig films
1965 films
DePatie–Freleng Enterprises short films
Films scored by William Lava
1960s Warner Bros. animated short films
1960s English-language films